The Cambrian Line, also known as the Cambrian Main Line and Cambrian Coast Line, is a railway line that runs from Shrewsbury, England, westwards to Aberystwyth and Pwllheli in Wales. Passenger train services are operated by Transport for Wales Rail between the western terminals of Pwllheli, Gwynedd, and Aberystwyth, Ceredigion, with the eastern terminal at Shrewsbury, Shropshire as part of the Wales & Borders franchise. The railway line is regarded to be scenic, as it passes through the Cambrian Mountains in central Wales, Snowdonia National Park and along the coast of Cardigan Bay.

The line includes long sections of rural single track and is designated as a community rail partnership.

Route
From Shrewsbury, the line heads west through northern Powys, serving the towns of Welshpool and Newtown, then continues further west calling at Caersws and then Machynlleth until reaching . At Dovey Junction, a short distance west of Machynlleth, the line splits into two branches: the southern branch goes to Aberystwyth, and the longer, northern branch continues to Pwllheli as the Cambrian Coast Line, crossing the River Mawddach by Barmouth Bridge. The section of the Cambrian Line between Shrewsbury and Aberystwyth may be called the Cambrian Main Line.

History
The line is made up of:
Shrewsbury and Welshpool Railway between Shrewsbury and Buttington
Oswestry and Newtown Railway between Buttington Junction and Newtown
Llanidloes and Newtown Railway between Newtown and Moat Lane Junction
Newtown and Machynlleth Railway between Moat Lane Junction and Machynlleth
Aberystwith and Welsh Coast Railway between Machynlleth and Aberystwyth/Pwllheli
These lines were constructed between 1855 and 1869. The section west of Buttington Junction became part of the Cambrian Railways in 1864.

The Cambrian Railways became part of the Great Western Railway under the Grouping Act of 1921. On nationalisation these lines were operated first by the Western Region of British Railways and later by the London Midland Region. In a later reorganisation, passenger services were operated by the Regional Railways Central sector. Following privatisation in the mid 1990s, passenger services were first operated by Central Trains, then by Wales & Borders from 2001, Arriva Trains Wales from 2003, KeolisAmey Wales from 2018 and publicly-owned Transport for Wales Rail from 2021.

Closed stations
Although the line survived the Beeching Axe, many stations were closed from the 1960s onwards. The stations closed include the following:

Shrewsbury to Dovey Junction:

 (connection with the Cambrian Railways line to Oswestry)

Moat Lane Junction (connection with Mid Wales Railway to Brecon)

 (reopening proposed, application at final stage)

 (connection with Mawddwy Railway to )

Dovey Junction to Aberystwyth:

 (reopened in 2021)

Dovey Junction to Pwllheli:

 (connection with the Carnarvonshire Railway to )

Politics
The Cambrian line was not directly threatened with closure in the 1963 Beeching Report. Later threats to the coastal part of the route, from Dovey Junction to Pwllheli, were subsequently withdrawn. Its tourism role is as a scenic route, as well as linking many coastal resorts and connecting to seven narrow-gauge tourist lines (these are the Talyllyn Railway, Welshpool and Llanfair Railway, Ffestiniog Railway, Welsh Highland Railway and the Vale of Rheidol Railway).

Performance

With long sections of single line and limited passing points, minor disruptions on the Cambrian Line quickly lead to compound delays and partial cancellations. This, combined with short turnaround times at each end of the route, led to severe unpunctuality during much of the first decade of the 21st century. The extension of the service to Birmingham International in late 2008 has helped address this by eliminating the tight turnarounds at the heavily congested Birmingham New Street station. Maintenance changes and additional padding in public timetables has also helped improve performance figures overall.

In Arriva Trains Wales' performance statistics the Cambrian Line was routinely the worst-performing service group between 2003 and 2008. Since early 2009, recorded timekeeping has improved – a considerable achievement, considering that the route has been the testing ground for brand new signalling technology previously unused on the British railway network.

Line upgrade
In October 2006, it was announced that Network Rail would pilot the European Rail Traffic Management System on the Cambrian Line. The ERTMS allows headways between trains using the same track to be reduced without affecting safety, allowing a more frequent service. Should the pilot scheme be successful, the system is expected to be rolled out on some other rural routes within the UK.

The upgrade was expected to cost £59 million and was to be completed by December 2008, but the system was only released, for limited testing between Pwllheli and Harlech, in February 2010. Three signallers from the Machynlleth signalling centre and seven drivers were trained to operate the new equipment. Ansaldo STS were the principal contractors for the upgrade, with Thales as sub-contractors for the Telecomms and Eldin as installation subcontractors for all elements of UK infrastructure. 
Systra was in charge of testing and commissioning the ETCS and interlocking components of the signalling system.

Ansaldo installed ERTMS In Cab ETCS (European Train Control System) level 2, class 1, specification V2.3.0 in 2011 (as noted below). As the name suggests, the driver receives the instructions for movement on the cab display. This level does not require conventional fixed signals – therefore all the existing signals and RETB boards have been removed.<ref>ERTMS/ETCS Railsigns.uk; Retrieved 2 August 2017</ref> Additionally, the line side speed signs were made redundant – drivers are given the appropriate maximum speed on the cab display (in kilometres per hour).

The Cambrian ERTMS – Pwllheli to Harlech rehearsal started on 13 February 2010 and completed successfully on 18 February 2010. The driver familiarisation and practical handling stage of the rehearsal provided an excellent opportunity to monitor the use of GSM-R voice in operation on this route. The first train departed Pwllheli at 08:53 in ERTMS Level 2 Operation with GSM-R voice being used as the only means of communication between the driver and the signaller.

Network Rail spokeswoman Mavis Choong was unable to give a figure for how much the scheme has cost, but said £400m was being spent installing it across the UK network. She claimed the 14-month delay was caused by the system "being new".
 
In 2007, a new flat crossing, named "Cae Pawb Crossing", was installed at the intersection of the Cambrian Line and the Welsh Highland Railway.

In October 2010, following completion of testing, the ERTMS system finally entered service between Pwllheli and Harlech and the previous Radio Electronic Token Block system was removed. On 18 March 2011, the final commissioning phase for the ERTMS system across the whole Cambrian route started, including layout alterations at Welshpool and Talerddig which would facilitate a desired increase in service frequency. At 07:20 on 26 March 2011, the New ERTMS signalling system was placed into operational use across the Cambrian Line controlled from Machynlleth, some 40 minutes ahead of the planned schedule.  Two days of driver familiarisation then followed; passenger operation started on 28 March 2011. An initial assessment by the operating company was not favourable: problems with the design and installation of the in-cab displays were identified and infrastructure failures included the control system becoming "confused" by common train movements, such as changes of speed or shunting into the depot.

Llanbadarn level-crossing incident
Shortly before 22:00 on Sunday 19 June 2011, a passenger train from Aberystwyth to Machynlleth ran onto the level crossing at Llanbadarn while the barriers at the crossing were raised, and came to a stop with the front of the train about  beyond the crossing. There were no road vehicles or pedestrians on the crossing at the time. The immediate cause of the incident was that the train driver did not notice that the indicator close to the crossing was flashing red until it was too late for him to stop the train before it reached the crossing. Factors behind this included the driver's "workload" (his need to observe a screen in the cab at the same time as he should also be observing a lineside indicator), the design of the equipment associated with the operation of the level crossing, and the re-setting of the signalling system on board the train before it could depart from Aberystwyth. An underlying cause of the incident was that the signalling system now in use on the lines from Shrewsbury to Aberystwyth and Pwllheli did not interface with the automatic level crossings on these routes.

The RAIB made six recommendations, three directed to Network Rail, two to Arriva Trains Wales and one to the Rail Safety and Standards Board. These cover the development of engineering solutions to mitigate the risk of trains passing over automatic crossings which have not operated correctly; changes to the operating equipment of Llanbadarn crossing; the processes used by railway operators to request permission to deviate from published standards; the operational requirements of drivers as trains depart from Aberystwyth; and the way in which drivers interact with the information screens of the cab signalling used on the Cambrian lines. The failure at ERTMS System-User Interface investigated by the RAIB indicates that the ERTMS Implementation did not satisfy the  non-functional attribute of safety integrity of the real time dependable distributed computing concepts.

2018 track upgrades
In 2018, Network Rail began upgrading  of track at a cost of £7.5 million. As well as improving reliability by replacing track, Network Rail and Powys County Council installed over a mile of new road and two road over rail bridges at Ystrad Fawr and Rallt. This has closed eight level crossings and improved safety for local residents.

ETCS upgrade announcement 2020
The UK Government Transport Secretary Grant Shapps announced on 21 August 2020 that £3m in funding had been authorised to advance plans to upgrade signalling on the  Cambrian line from Shrewsbury Sutton Bridge Junction to Aberystwyth and Pwllheli. "The planned state-of-the-art digital signalling system will modernise the network, improving reliability of services, and supporting the introduction of a new fleet being rolled out across the network in December 2022", the minister said.

Services

As of 2016, the Aberystwyth line has a near-hourly service and twelve direct trains between Aberystwyth and Shrewsbury daily, with several extended to or from Birmingham International. Trains to Pwllheli typically operate once every two hours, either as separate connecting services running to/from Machynlleth, or as portions attached to Aberystwyth services with trains dividing or joining at Machynlleth as necessary.

Trains now run more frequently than before: resignalling of the railway and other infrastructure changes have allowed more trains to run to and from Aberystwyth since 2015. Connections are better too, as some trains run through from Birmingham New Street to Birmingham International and some also stop at Smethwick Galton Bridge from December 2009. From the 1990s until 2015, a service had typically been provided between Birmingham and Aberystwyth every two hours, with a reduced service on Sundays.

The last scheduled freight over the line was in 1993. In 2003, freight multiple unit trials were undertaken for five weeks, transporting timber from Aberystwyth, via Wrexham General railway station to the Kronospan woodchip factory in Chirk. The trial used a pair of British Rail MPV units sandwiched around a rake of seven open-sided timber wagons. An additional trial was held on 29 April 2022 pulled by a pair of Class 37 locomotives owned by Network Rail, thanks to a partnership with the freight operator Colas Rail. The Class 37s were used, as they are one of few locomotives equipped with ETCS signalling used on the line, and due to their ability to haul the train over the steep gradients along the line. 

Steam workings

In 2007, West Coast Railways took over operation of the Cambrian Coast Express which ran over the Cambrian Coast Line from Machynlleth to Porthmadog and Pwllheli, the train was also renamed to The Cambrian''. The service would run from the last week of July until the end of August between 2007 and 2010.

Before the 2011 season, WCR issued a statement stating that due to Network Rail's implementation of the new European Rail Traffic Management System (ERTMS) signalling on the Cambrian Coast, which necessitated new in-cab signalling equipment, the seasonal steam services had to cease running because no system is yet available for fitment in steam locomotives. No steam loco owners are at present planning to upgrade their locos to work under the system in the near future owing to costs and the amount of required equipment at present. Locos that have visited the route over the years include: 7802 Bradley Manor, 7819 Hinton Manor, 44871, 46443, 75069 & 76079.

Coast Line infrastructure problems
Major structural problems with Barmouth Bridge resulted in the withdrawal of services between 1980 and 1986 and the line was threatened with closure before ultimately being repaired and reopened.

Work began in March 2013 to replace the wooden Pont Briwet viaduct over the Afon Dwyryd near . The new bridge now carries two lanes of road traffic and the single track railway, and opened in 2015. It was hoped that, apart from a four-week period where power cables had to be moved, the old viaduct could remain open throughout the works. However, the bridge was found to have been affected by the piling work for the new bridge, and was declared structurally unsafe and closed in December 2013. A new temporary bridge was due to open in Spring 2014, but this plan had been scrapped in favour of running a convoy system on the A496 road that serves as the diversionary route. Work then focused on completing the main railway and road bridge by the end of the year.

Part of the sea wall protecting the trackbed at Llanaber near Barmouth was washed away, resulting in some 300 tons of ballast being lost and the formation covered in debris, whilst further south a section of embankment at Tonfanau was washed out. Two of Arriva Trains Wales's  trains were trapped at Barmouth, and were removed by road. Network Rail described the damage suffered by the line as "devastating", but stated the line to Barmouth could be (and was) reopened . Repairs north of Barmouth have been completed, and the line reopened to Harlech on 1 May 2014, two weeks ahead of schedule.

The full line reopened on 1 September 2014.

See also
Rail transport in Shropshire
Heart of Wales Line
 Map of places on 'Cambrian Line' compiled from this article

Notes and references

External links

Cambrian Lines Partnership
Cambrian Coast Railway Visitor Guide
Shrewsbury to Aberystwyth Rail Passengers' Association
Usage statistics for stations on the line
Rail Magazine
Scenic Rail Britain: Cambrian Coast Lines

Railway lines in Wales
Rail transport in Shropshire
Rail transport in Gwynedd
Standard gauge railways in England
Standard gauge railways in Wales
Community railway lines in England
Community railway lines in Wales